The 2014–15 Eerste Divisie, known as Jupiler League for sponsorship reasons, was the fifty-ninth season of Eerste Divisie since its establishment in 1955. It began in August 2014 with the first matches of the season and will end in May 2015 with the returns of the finals of the promotion/relegation play-offs, involving also the 16th- and 17th-placed teams from the 2014–15 Eredivisie.

Teams
A total of 20 teams took part in the league. Willem II were promoted from the Eerste Divisie as 2013–14 champions and replaced by bottom-placed Eredivisie Roda JC Kerkrade, whereas Dordrecht and Excelsior won a top flight place in the nacompetitie, replacing NEC and RKC Waalwijk who were eliminated from the post-season playoff and therefore relegated to Eerste Divisie for this season.

Stadia and locations

Personnel and kits

 Roda JC and Telstar are using match-day sponsorship system, so they have different sponsor every time they play.

League table

Winners by period
 First period (Weeks 1–9): N.E.C.
 Second period (Weeks 10–18): Almere City
 Third period (Weeks 19-27): Oss
 Fourth period (Weeks 28-38): Eindhoven

References

External links
 

Eerste Divisie seasons
Netherlands 2
2